Debbie Clarke (born 10 April 1961) is a Canadian former freestyle swimmer. She competed in three events at the 1976 Summer Olympics.

References

External links
 

1961 births
Living people
Canadian female freestyle swimmers
Olympic swimmers of Canada
Swimmers at the 1976 Summer Olympics
Sportspeople from Thunder Bay